is the integrated retail and corporate banking unit of Mizuho Financial Group, the third largest financial services company in Japan, with total assets of approximately $1.8 trillion in 2017. Mizuho is one of the three so-called Japanese "megabanks" (along with MUFG and SMBC). Mizuho Bank provides financial products and services to a wide range of clients, including individuals, small and medium-sized enterprises, large corporations, financial institutions and public sector entities. Its headquarters office building is located in the Otemachi district of Chiyoda, Tokyo.

Mizuho Bank has over 505 branches and offices in Japan and in 38 other countries, and is the only bank to have branches in every prefecture in Japan.

The name "Mizuho" is an archaic Japanese term meaning "golden ears of rice," and was used in the classical text Nihon Shoki to describe Japan.

History

Announced in 1999, Mizuho Financial Group was established on April 1, 2002 by the merger of Dai-Ichi Kangyo Bank, Fuji Bank and the Industrial Bank of Japan. All three predecessors were major financial institutions in their own right and had served as cornerstones of major zaibatsu (prewar era) and keiretsu (postwar era). In April 2002, Mizuho Corporate Bank and Mizuho Bank were established as two core banking subsidiaries of Mizuho Financial Group through a split and merger process reorganizing the three legacy banks. It was the first financial holding company structure created among major Japanese banks. Mizuho Corporate Bank focused on large corporations, financial institutions and public sector entities in Japan and overseas. Mizuho Bank focused on individuals and small and medium-sized companies in Japan.

Mizuho Corporate Bank engaged in steady expansion overseas, opening twenty overseas offices between 2005 and 2010, particularly in China, as well as in the Americas, Europe and Middle East. In 2006, Mizuho Corporate Bank became the first Japanese bank to obtain financial holding company status in the U.S., and Mizuho Financial Group listed its ADRs on the New York Stock Exchange.

The two banks were initially consolidated under a holding company, Mizuho Holdings. On October 1, 2005 they were transferred to a new holding vehicle, Mizuho Financial Group. On July 1, 2013, a merger between the former Mizuho Bank and the former Mizuho Corporate Bank took place, and the institution was named Mizuho Bank.

Services
Mizuho services include current accounts, domestic and international cash cards, international money transfers, credit cards, saving accounts, loans, and Internet banking.

See also

Mizuho Financial Group
Mizuho Corporate Bank

References

External links
Mizuho Bank
 Mizuho Bank
Mizuho Financial Group

Financial services companies established in 2002
Banks established in 2002
Banks of Japan
Financial services companies based in Tokyo
Japanese brands
Investment banks of Japan
Bank, Mizuho
Fuyo Group
Furukawa Group
Conglomerate companies based in Tokyo